The Little Snake River is a tributary of the Yampa River, approximately  long, in southwestern Wyoming and northwestern Colorado in the United States.

It rises near the continental divide, in Routt National Forest in northern Routt County, Colorado, along the northern edge of the Park Range. It flows west along the Wyoming-Colorado state line, meandering across the border several times and flowing past the Wyoming towns of Dixon and Baggs. It turns southwest and flows through Moffat County, Colorado, joining the Yampa approximately 45 mi (72 km) west of Craig, just east of Dinosaur National Monument. The Little Snake is not generally navigable except seasonally in years of plentiful water.

See also
 List of rivers of Colorado
 List of rivers of Wyoming
 List of tributaries of the Colorado River
 George R. Salisbury, Jr.

References

Rivers of Colorado
Rivers of Wyoming
Tributaries of the Colorado River
Rivers of Moffat County, Colorado
Rivers of Routt County, Colorado
Tributaries of the Colorado River in Colorado
Rivers of Carbon County, Wyoming